Profanity, also known as cursing, cussing, swearing, bad language, foul language, obscenities, expletives or vulgarism, is a socially offensive use of language. Accordingly, profanity is language use that is sometimes deemed impolite, rude, indecent, or culturally offensive; in certain religions, it constitutes sin. It can show a debasement of someone or something, or be considered an expression of strong feeling towards something. Some words may also be used as intensifiers.

In its older, more literal sense, "profanity" refers to a lack of respect for things that are held to be sacred, which implies anything inspiring or deserving of reverence, as well as behaviour showing similar disrespect or causing religious offense.

Etymology
The term profane originates from classical Latin , literally "before (outside) the temple",  meaning 'outside' and  meaning 'temple' or 'sanctuary'. The term profane carried the meaning of either "desecrating what is holy" or "with a secular purpose" as early as the 1450s. Profanity represented secular indifference to religion or religious figures, while blasphemy was a more offensive attack on religion and religious figures, considered sinful, and a direct violation of The Ten Commandments in the majority-Christian Western world. Moreover, many Bible verses speak against swearing. In some countries, profanity words often have pagan roots that after Christian influence were turned from names of deities and spirits to profanity and used as such, like famous Finnish profanity word , which was believed to be an original name of the thunder god Ukko, the chief god of the Finnish pagan pantheon.

Profanities, in the original meaning of blasphemous profanity, are part of the ancient tradition of the comic cults which laughed and scoffed at the deity or deities: an example of this would be Lucian's Dialogues of the Gods satire.

English
In English, swear words and curse words like shit have a Germanic root, as likely does fuck, though damn and piss come from Old French and ultimately Latin. The more technical and polite alternatives are often Latin in origin, such as defecate or excrete (for shit) and fornicate or copulate (for fuck). Due to the stereotype of English profanity being largely Germanic, profanity is sometimes referred to colloquially as "Anglo-Saxon", in reference to the oldest form of English. This is not always the case. The word "wanker" is considered profane in Britain, but it dates only to the mid-20th century.

History
Words currently considered curse words or profanity were common parlance in medieval English. In the Elizabethan era, some playwrights, like Shakespeare, largely avoided direct use of these words, but others, like Ben Jonson, did use them in his plays. Another profanity, damn, has its origins in Latin, with the word  meaning 'to damage, hurt or harm'.

Research

Analyses of recorded conversations circa 1972 revealed that an average of roughly 80–90 words that a person spoke each day — 0.5% to 0.7% of all words — were curse words, with usage varying from 0% to 3.4%. In comparison, first-person plural pronouns (we, us, our) make up 1% of spoken words.

A three-country poll conducted by Angus Reid Public Opinion in July 2010 found that Canadians swear more often than Americans and British when talking to friends, while Britons are more likely than Canadians and Americans to hear strangers swear during a conversation.

Swearing performs certain psychological functions, and uses particular linguistic and neurological mechanisms; all these are avenues of research. New York Times author Natalie Angier notes that functionally similar behavior can be observed in chimpanzees, and may contribute to our understanding. Angier also notes that swearing is a widespread but perhaps underappreciated anger management technique; that "Men generally curse more than women, unless said women are in a sorority, and that university provosts swear more than librarians or the staff members of the university day care center".

Keele University researchers Stephens, Atkins, and Kingston found that swearing relieves the effects of physical pain. Stephens said "I would advise people, if they hurt themselves, to swear". However, the overuse of swear words tends to diminish this effect. The Keele team won the Ig Nobel Peace Prize in 2010 for their research.

A team of neurologists and psychologists at the UCLA Easton Center for Alzheimer's Disease Research suggested that swearing may help differentiate Alzheimer's disease from frontotemporal dementia.

Neurologist Antonio Damasio noted that despite the loss of language due to damage to the language areas of the brain, patients were still often able to swear.

A group of researchers from Wright State University studied why people swear in the online world by collecting tweets posted on Twitter. They found that cursing is associated with negative emotions such as sadness (21.83%) and anger (16.79%), thus showing people in the online world mainly use curse words to express their sadness and anger towards others.

An interdisciplinary team of researchers from the University of Warsaw investigated bilingual swearing, and how it is easier to swear in a foreign language, finding that bilinguals strengthen the offensiveness of profanities when they switch into their second language, but soften it when they switch into their first tongue, doing both statistically significantly only in the case of ethnophaulisms (ethnic slurs), leading the scientists to the conclusion that switching into the second language exempts bilinguals from the social norms and constraints (whether own or socially imposed) such as political correctness, and makes them more prone to swearing and offending others.

Types 

According to Steven Pinker, there are five possible functions of swearing:
 Abusive swearing, intended to offend, intimidate or otherwise cause emotional or psychological harm
 Cathartic swearing, used in response to pain or misfortune
 Dysphemistic swearing, used to convey that the speaker thinks negatively of the subject matter and to make the listener do the same
 Emphatic swearing, intended to draw additional attention to what is considered to be worth paying attention to
 Idiomatic swearing, used for no other particular purpose, but as a sign that the conversation and relationship between speaker and listener is informal

In addition, Coprolalia, which is an occasional characteristic of tic disorders, is involuntary swearing or the involuntary utterance of obscene words or socially inappropriate and derogatory remarks. It encompasses words and phrases that are culturally taboo or generally unsuitable for acceptable social use, when used out of context. The term is not used to describe contextual swearing. It can be distinguished from voluntary profanity by characteristics such as interrupting the flow of dialogue, differences in tone and volume relative to a normal voice, variable frequency that increases with anxiety, and association with brain disorders. It is usually expressed out of social or emotional context, and may be spoken in a louder tone or different cadence or pitch than normal conversation. It can be a single word, or complex phrases.

Slurs vs. profanity
Profanity is widely considered socially offensive and strongly impolite; slurs, however, are both intended to be and by definition are derogatory, as they are meant to harm another individual. Although profanity has been seen to improve performance or relieve anxiety and anger, and can be used in a lighthearted way, this effect and impact cannot be observed with slurs. Though slurs are considered profanity by definition, being both socially offensive and strongly impolite, profanity can be used in a non-targeted manner where slurs cannot. For example, in the sentence "If I don't get an A on this exam, I'm fucked", the word "fucked" is profanity; however, the way it is embedded is not intended to offend anyone, as the speaker is not making an offensive claim.

Legality

Australia
In every Australian state and territory it is a crime to use offensive, indecent or insulting language in or near a public place. These offences are classed as summary offences. This means that they are usually tried before a local or magistrates court. Police also have the power to issue fixed penalty notices to alleged offenders. It is a defence in some Australian jurisdictions to have "a reasonable excuse" to conduct oneself in the manner alleged.

Brazil
In Brazil, the Penal Code does not contain any penalties for profanity in public immediately. However, direct offenses against one can be considered a crime against honor, with a penalty of imprisonment of one to three months or a fine. The analysis of the offence is considered "subjective", depending on the context of the discussion and the relationship between the parts.

Canada
Section 175 of Canada's Criminal Code makes it a criminal offence to "cause a disturbance in or near a public place" by "swearing […] or using insulting or obscene language". Provinces and municipalities may also have their laws against swearing in public. For instance, the Municipal Code of Toronto bars "profane or abusive language" in public parks. In June 2016, a man in Halifax, Nova Scotia, was arrested for using profane language at a protest against Bill C-51.

India
Sections 294A and 294B of Indian penal code have legal provisions for punishing individuals who use inappropriate or obscene words (either spoken or written) in public that are maliciously deliberate to outrage religious feelings or beliefs. In February 2015, a local court in Mumbai asked police to file a first information report against 14 Bollywood celebrities who were part of the stage show of All India Bakchod, a controversial comedy stage show known for vulgar and profanity based content. In May 2019 during the election campaign, Indian Prime Minister Narendra Modi listed out the abusive words the opposition Congress party had used against him and his mother during their campaign.

In January 2016, a Mumbai-based communications agency initiated a campaign against profanity and abusive language called "Gaali free India" ( is the Hindi word for profanity). Using creative ads, it called upon people to use swatch (clean) language on the lines of Swachh Bharat Mission for nationwide cleanliness. It further influenced other news media outlets who further raised the issue of abusive language in the society especially incest abuses against women, such as "mother fucker".

In an increasing market for OTT content, several Indian web series have been using profanity and expletives to gain attention of the audiences.

New Zealand
In New Zealand, the Summary Offences Act 1981 makes it illegal to use "indecent or obscene words in or within hearing of any public place". However, if the defendant has "reasonable grounds for believing that his words would not be overheard" then no offence is committed. Also, "the court shall have regard to all the circumstances pertaining at the material time, including whether the defendant had reasonable grounds for believing that the person to whom the words were addressed, or any person by whom they might be overheard, would not be offended".

Pakistan 
Political leaders in Pakistan have been consistently picked up for using profane, abusive language. While there is no legislation to punish abusers, the problem aggravated with abusive language being used in the parliament and even against women.

Philippines
The Department of Education in the Philippine city of Baguio expressed that while cursing was prohibited in schools, children were not following this prohibition at home. Thus as part of its anti profanity initiative, in November 2018, the Baguio city government in the Philippines passed an anti profanity law that prohibits cursing and profanity in areas of the city frequented by children. This move was welcomed by educators and the Department of Education in Cordillera.

Russia
Swearing in public is an administrative crime in Russia. However, law enforcement rarely targets swearing people. The punishment is a fine of 500–1000 roubles or even a 15-day imprisonment.

United Kingdom

In public
Swearing, in and of itself, is not usually a criminal offence in the United Kingdom although in context may constitute a component of a crime. However, it may be a criminal offence in Salford Quays under a public spaces protection order which outlaws the use of "foul and abusive language" without specifying any further component to the offence, although it appears to be unclear as to whether all and every instance of swearing is covered. Salford City Council claims that the defence of "reasonable excuse" allows all the circumstances to be taken into account. In England and Wales, swearing in public where it is seen to cause harassment, alarm or distress may constitute an offence under section 5(1) and (6) of the Public Order Act 1986. In Scotland, a similar common law offence of breach of the peace covers issues causing public alarm and distress.

In the workplace
In the United Kingdom, swearing in the workplace can be an act of gross misconduct under certain circumstances. In particular, this is the case when swearing accompanies insubordination against a superior or humiliation of a subordinate employee. However, in other cases, it may not be grounds for instant dismissal. According to a UK site on work etiquette, the "fact that swearing is a part of everyday life means that we need to navigate away through a day in the office without offending anyone, while still appreciating that people do swear. Of course, there are different types of swearing and, without spelling it out, you really ought to avoid the 'worst words' regardless of who you're talking to". Within the UK, the appropriateness of swearing can vary largely by a person's industry of employment, though it is still not typically used in situations where employees of a higher position than oneself are present.

In 2006, The Guardian reported that "36% of the 308 UK senior managers and directors having responded to a survey accepted swearing as part of workplace culture", but warned about specific inappropriate uses of swearing such as when it is discriminatory or part of bullying behaviour. The article ended with a quotation from Ben Wilmott (Chartered Institute of Personnel and Development): "Employers can ensure professional language in the workplace by having a well-drafted policy on bullying and harassment that emphasises how bad language has potential to amount to harassment or bullying."

United States

In the United States, courts have generally ruled that the government does not have the right to prosecute someone solely for the use of an expletive, which would be a violation of their right to free speech enshrined in the First Amendment. On the other hand, they have upheld convictions of people who used profanity to incite riots, harass people, or disturb the peace. In 2011, a North Carolina statute that made it illegal to use "indecent or profane language" in a "loud and boisterous manner" within earshot of two or more people on any public road or highway was struck down as unconstitutional. In 2015, the US city of Myrtle Beach passed an ordinance that makes profane language punishable with fines up to $500 and/or 30 days in jail. An amount of $22,000 was collected from these fines in 2017 alone.

Religious views

Judaism
Judaism forbids the use of profanity as contradicting the Torah's command to "Be holy", which revolves around the concept of separating oneself from worldly practices (including the use of vulgar language). The Talmud teaches that the words that leave the mouth make an impact on the heart and mind; the use of profanity thus causes the regression of the soul. Judaism thus teaches that shemirat halashon (guarding one's tongue) is one of the first steps to spiritual improvement.

Christianity
In Christianity, the use of foul language is condemned as being sinful, a position held since the time of the early Church. To this end, the Bible commands "Don't use foul or abusive language. Let everything you say be good and helpful, so that your words will be an encouragement to those who hear them" and also "Let there be no filthiness nor foolish talk nor crude joking, which are out of place, but instead let there be thanksgiving". These teachings are echoed in Ecclesiasticus 20:19, Ecclesiasticus 23:8-15, and Ecclesiasticus 17:13-15, all of which are found in the Deuterocanon/Apocrypha. Jesus taught that "by your words you will be justified, and by your words you will be condemned." (cf. Matthew 12:36), with revilers being listed as being among the damned in 1 Corinthians 6:9-10. Profanity revolving around the dictum "Thou shalt not take the name of the Lord thy God in vain", one of the Ten Commandments, is regarded as blasphemy as Christians regard it as "an affront to God's holiness". Paul the Apostle defines the ridding of filthy language from one's lips as being evidence of living in a relationship with Jesus (cf. Colossians 3:1-10). The Epistle to the Colossians teaches that controlling the tongue "is the key to gaining mastery over the whole body." The Didache 3:3 included the use of foul language as being part of the lifestyle that puts one on the way to eternal death. The same document commands believers not to use profanity as it "breeds adultery". John Chrysostom, an early Church Father, taught that those engaged in the use of profanity should repent of the sin. The Epistle of James holds that "blessing God" is the primary function of the Christian's tongue, not speaking foul language. Saint Tikhon of Zadonsk, a bishop of Eastern Orthodox Church, lambasted profanity and blasphemy, teaching that it is "extremely unbefitting [for] Christians" and that believers should guard themselves from ever using it.

Islam 
In Islam, the use of profanity is haram. Additionally, impertinence and slander are considered immoral acts.

Minced oaths

Minced oaths are euphemistic expressions made by altering or clipping profane and blasphemous words and expressions to make them less or not objectionable. Although minced oaths are often acceptable in situations where profanity is not (including the radio), some people still consider them profanity. In 1941, a judge threatened a lawyer with contempt of court for using the word darn.

Impact on society

While there is no evidence of harmful effects of swearing (for instance, that it leads to physical violence), there is research showing that swearing is associated with enhanced pain tolerance. A study by Stephens, Atkins and Kingston (2009) concluded that swearing prompts a fight-or-flight response and quashes the link between the fear of pain and the perception of pain itself.

Research by Jay and Janschewitz suggests that swearing emerges by age two. By the time children enter school, they have a working vocabulary of 30–40 "offensive words", and their swearing becomes similar to that of adults around the age of 11 to 12.

There is no established consensus as to how children learn to swear, although it is an inevitable part of language learning, and begins early in life. Young school children may adopt various "toning down" strategies when swearing depending on the context in which they are talking.

A 2017 paper by Gilad Feldman and co-workers claimed to show a correlation between swearing and various measures of honesty. From three separate studies, the authors "found a consistent positive relationship between profanity and honesty; profanity was associated with less lying and deception at the individual level and with higher integrity at the society level". However, the methodology of this study has been challenged by other psychologists, and the study is a subject of ongoing controversy.

In popular culture
 The Catcher in the Rye published in novel form in 1951 by J. D. Salinger became controversial for its use of the word fuck.
 Gone with the Wind, a 1939 film based on the novel by Margaret Mitchell includes the line "Frankly, my dear, I don't give a damn." This has been claimed to be the first use of profanity in a major American film, although films produced in America prior to 1935 occasionally used strong language and gestures.
 Seven Dirty Words is a 1972 comedy monologue by George Carlin in which he named the seven words that, he said, must never be used in a television broadcast.
 Kurt Vonnegut's use of the word motherfucker in his novel Slaughterhouse-Five became a subject of much controversy and led to his books being banned (and in some cases physically destroyed) by several public and school libraries.
 Comedian Lenny Bruce was arrested in 1961, 1962, and 1964 for obscenity and profanity in his comedic sets.
 American director Quentin Tarantino is infamous for the use of profanity in his films.
 British film director Ken Loach generated media debate with his 2002 film Sweet Sixteen, as the British Board of Film Classification gave it an 18 certificate for the very large amount of profanity, and not for any violent or sexual content. Loach argued that the language used was typical of the working classes in Greenock in Scotland and that the BBFC censors had a "London-centric view".
 Brandon Sanderson, in an annotation for his 2007 novel The Well of Ascension, mentions that some readers are put off by "light" cursing:

 Several vehicle models have been given names that have an inappropriate meaning in a language foreign to the vendor's home country, such as the Mitsubishi Pajero (rebranded as "Montero") and the Audi e-tron. Another example of a vehicle named after a term with a profane meaning is the Hellcat version of the Dodge Challenger, Dodge Charger, and Dodge Durango; the word "hell" (first pronunciation of the version name) is reportedly forbidden in most US states when applying for a license plate.

See also

 Animal epithet
 Army creole
 Bleep censor
 Fighting words
 Fuck: Word Taboo and Protecting Our First Amendment Liberties
 Maledictology
 Mandarin Chinese profanity
 Profanity in science fiction 
 R v Penguin Books Ltd
 "Sailor Mouth"
 Scunthorpe problem
 Swear jar
 Verbal abuse
 Vulgarity
 Wordfilter
"Rude Removal"

References

Further reading
 
 Bryson, Bill (1990) The Mother Tongue
 
 
 
 
 
 Johnson, Sterling (2004) Watch Your F*cking Language
 McEnery, Tony (2006) Swearing in English: bad language, purity and power from 1586 to the present, Routledge .
 
 O'Connor, Jim (2000) Cuss Control
 Sagarin Edward (1962) The Anatomy of Dirty Words
 Sheidlower, Jesse (2009) The F-Word (3rd ed.)
 Spears, Richard A. (1990) Forbidden American English
 
 Wajnryb, Ruth (2005) Expletive Deleted: A Good Look at Bad Language

External links

 Most vulgar words in The Online Slang Dictionary (as voted by visitors)
 

 
Blasphemy
Obscenity
Censorship
Connotation
Bullying